Yebawmi is a river village in Homalin Township, Hkamti District, in the Sagaing Region of northwestern Burma. It is located near Hwepanan. Yebawmi lies on the banks of the Uyu River and is noted for its salt springs and waistcloth weaving.

References

External links
Maplandia World Gazetteer

Populated places in Hkamti District
Homalin Township